The Norwegian Theatre Critics Award (Den norske Teaterkritikerprisen or Kritikerprisen) is awarded by the Norwegian Critics' Association (Norsk Kritikerlag) and has been awarded every year since 1939 (except 1940-45). For other Norwegian Critics Awards, see the Norwegian Literature Critics Award, which has been awarded every year since 1950, the Norwegian Music Critics Award, which has been awarded every year since 1947, and the Norwegian Dance Critics Award, which has been awarded every year since 1977.

Annual Norwegian Theatre Critics Award winners
 1939/40 – Lars Tvinde and Olafr Havrevold
 1940/41 – Gerd Egede-Nissen
 1940–45 – Not rewarded
 1946/47 – Knut Hergel and Hans Jacob Nilsen
 1947/48 – Ada Kramm
 1948/49 – Helen Brinchmann
 1949/50 – Aase Bye
 1950/51 – Gerda Ring
 1951/52 – Ragnhild Hald
 1952/53 – August Oddvar
 1953/54 – Ola Isene
 1954/55 – Espen Skjønberg
 1955/56 – Stein Grieg Halvorsen and Knut Wigert
 1956/57 – Kolbjørn Buøen
 1957/58 – Rønnaug Alten
 1958/59 – Claes Gill
 1959/60 – Ella Hval
 1960/61 – Per Aabel
 1961/62 – Tordis Maurstad
 1962/63 – Toralv Maurstad
 1963/64 – Liv Strømsted
 1964/65 – Wenche Foss
 1965/66 – Per Sunderland
 1966/67 – Georg Løkkeberg
 1967/68 – Lasse Kolstad
 1968/69 – Aud Schønemann
 1969/70 – Arne Walentin
 1970/71 – Henki Kolstad
 1971/72 – Bjarne Andersen
 1972/73 – Pål Løkkeberg
 1973/74 – Frank Robert
 1974/75 – Jack Fjeldstad
 1975/76 – Bjørn Endreson
 1976/77 – Tormod Skagestad
 1977/78 – Harald Heide Steen
 1978/79 – Lubos Hruza
 1979/80 – Ingebjørg Sem
 1980/81 – Britt Langlie
 1981/82 – Stein Winge
 1982/83 – Alexandra Myskova
 1983/84 – Kjersti Germeten
 1984/85 – Gisle Straume
 1985/86 – Rut Tellefsen (did not want to receive the award)
 1986/87 – Bjørn Sundquist
 1987/88 – Terje Mærli and Christian Egemar
 1988/89 – Terje Strømdahl
 1989/90 – Nils Ole Oftebro
 1990/91 – Jorunn Kjellsby
 1991/92 – Jon Eikemo
 1992/93 – Lise Fjeldstad
 1993/94 – Helge Hoff Monsen
 1994/95 – Svein Tindberg
 1995/96 – Sverre Anker Ousdal
 1996/97 – Nils Sletta
 1997/98 – Even Stormoen
 1998/99 – Yngve Sundvor
 1999/00 – Kjetil Bang-Hansen
 2000/01 – Anders Hatlo
 2001/02 – Hildegunn Eggen
 2002/03 – Dennis Storhøi
 2003/04 – Lasse Kolsrud
 2004/05 – Henrik Rafaelsen
 2005/06 – Øystein Røger
 2006/07 – Sven Nordin
 2007/08 – Vegard Vinge and Ida Müller
 2008/09 – Eirik Stubø
 2009/10 – Thorbjørn Harr
 2010/11 – Heidi Gjermundsen Broch

References

Norwegian theatre awards

de:Kritikerprisen (Norwegen)
no:Kritikerprisen
nn:Den norske Kritikerprisen
ru:Премия Ассоциации норвежских критиков
sv:Kritikerpriset (Norge)